The Order of Merit of Schleswig-Holstein is an award presented by the Minister-President of  German state Schleswig-Holstein.  Established in 2008, it is the highest award of the state.  Prior to 2008, the Schleswig-Holstein-Medaille was the highest award of the state.  In the establishing decree of the order it states prior recipients of the medal are members of the order.  To preserve the exclusivity of the order it is limited to 500 living recipients.

Notable recipients
 Dennis Snower
 Christoph Eschenbach
 Justus Frantz
 Klaus Fußmann
 Ulrich Schulte-Wülwer
 Angelika Volquartz
 Knut Kiesewetter
 Carl Holst
 Lü Zushan
 Jens Oddershede
 Toshizō Ido
 Mojib Latif
 Otto Bernhardt
 Detlev Buck

References

Schleswig-Holstein
Schleswig-Holstein
Culture of Schleswig-Holstein